Isidudu is a soft porridge made from ground corn known as mealie meal. It is a common breakfast in Xhosa and Zulu households. It is served with sugar and milk. Some may prefer white/brown vinegar and sugar or butter/peanutbutter and sugar etc. Sometimes the ground corn is fermented to have a sour taste.

See also
 List of African dishes

External links
A typical recipe

South African cuisine